Martí is a crater on Mercury. Its name was adopted by the International Astronomical Union (IAU) in 1976. Martí is named for the Cuban writer José Martí, who lived from 1853 to 1895.

References

Impact craters on Mercury